Mansbridge One on One was a weekly TV program on CBC Television featuring CBC's News' chief correspondent Peter Mansbridge who is a  12-time Gemini Award recipient and officer of the Order of Canada. The program began airing in 1999,  and had featured interviews with the likes of Hillary Clinton.

The show ended once Peter Mansbridge retired from the CBC in 2017.

References

External links
 http://www.cbc.ca/thenational/mansbridge/
 http://archives.cbc.ca/programs/1059/

CBC Television original programming
1999 Canadian television series debuts
1990s Canadian television talk shows